The Mentasta Mountains in the eastern part of the U.S. state of Alaska form the eastern end of the Alaska Range.
They lie south of the Alaska Highway, east of the Glenn Highway, north of the Wrangell Mountains, and west of the Nabesna River. Across the Glenn Highway lies the continuation of the Alaska Range, while across the Nabesna River lie the Nutzotin Mountains. They form the northern boundary of Wrangell-St. Elias National Park & Preserve.

References

External links

Alaska Range
Landforms of Southeast Fairbanks Census Area, Alaska
Landforms of Copper River Census Area, Alaska
Mountains of Unorganized Borough, Alaska
Wrangell–St. Elias National Park and Preserve